Enrique 'Quique' Rivero Pérez (born 16 April 1992) is a Spanish footballer who plays for Real Unión as a midfielder.

Club career
Born Cabezón de la Sal, Cantabria, Rivero was a product of local Racing de Santander's youth system. He made his first-team – and La Liga – debut on 12 April 2012, starting in the 0–3 home loss against RCD Mallorca.

On 16 July 2013, after suffering two consecutive relegations with his first club, Rivero signed with Segunda División side CD Tenerife. He scored his first professional goal on 20 April of the following year, the winner in a 3–2 home victory over CD Numancia.

On 3 August 2015, after being deemed surplus to requirements by manager Raül Agné, Rivero moved to FC Cartagena of Segunda División B. He continued competing in that tier the following seasons, with Racing, Recreativo de Huelva and Real Unión.

References

External links

1992 births
Living people
Spanish footballers
Footballers from Cantabria
Association football midfielders
La Liga players
Segunda División players
Segunda División B players
Tercera División players
Primera Federación players
Rayo Cantabria players
Racing de Santander players
CD Tenerife players
FC Cartagena footballers
Recreativo de Huelva players
Real Unión footballers